The Democratic Party was a centrist political party in South Korea established on September 21, 2014. The party had one representative in the 19th National Assembly, Shin Ki-nam, formerly a member of the Minjoo Party of Korea. The party lost its seat in the 2016 legislative election. In October 19, 2016, the party officially merged with the Democratic Party of Korea.

References

Political parties in South Korea
Political parties established in 2014
Political parties disestablished in 2016
2014 establishments in South Korea
2016 disestablishments in South Korea
Centrist parties in Asia
Defunct political parties in South Korea
Democratic parties in South Korea
Minjoo Party of Korea